Uwaifo Williams Aituae known as 'Zexzy', is a Nigerian rapper, singer and songwriter from Benin City. He records in Yoruba and English.

Early life and musical beginnings 
Uwaifo has 5 siblings. He is the fifth of 5 children.

He was diagnosed with Rhinitis and lost his voice in 2007. He has been battling since then  and has not recovered in full.

He was seen walking in Kenya with an outfit like Shao Kahn.

Music career 
In 2022, he released a song called 'Obsession' that entered the charts in iTunes   Boomplay ad Shazam.

Awards and nominations

See also 

 List of Nigerian musicians
 List of Nigerian rappers

References 

Nigerian musicians
Yoruba-language singers
Living people
Year of birth missing (living people)